The 2012 United States House of Representatives elections in New York were held on Tuesday, November 6, 2012 to elect the twenty-seven U.S. representatives from the state, one from each of the state's twenty seven congressional districts, a loss of two seats following the 2010 United States Census. The elections coincided with the elections of other federal and state offices, including a quadrennial presidential election, and a U.S. Senate election.  The two existing districts that were eliminated were District 9, held by Republican Rep. Bob Turner, and District 22, held by retiring Democratic Rep. Maurice Hinchey.

Party primary elections occurred June 26, 2012, with the general election coinciding with the national elections on November 6, 2012.

On election day, the Democratic Party regained two seats previously held by Republicans, while the Republican Party regained one seat previously held by a Democrat.  In the 113th Congress, which first met on January 3, 2013, the New York delegation initially consisted of 21 Democrats and six Republicans.

Redistricting 
Each caucus in the New York State Legislature submitted their proposed 27-district maps to an appointed special master on February 29, 2012.  On March 6, the special master Judge Roanne L. Mann released her own proposed map, and slightly revised them again on March 12.
On March 19, the United States District Court for the Eastern District of New York imposed the special master's maps, with minor modifications.

Overview

District 1 

Incumbent Democrat Tim Bishop, who was first elected in 2002, kicked off his re-election campaign in April 2011. In March 2011, Bishop was included in a list of potentially vulnerable Democrats by the Democratic Congressional Campaign Committee.
Bishop also had the endorsement of the Working Families Party.

Randy Altschuler defeated George Demos in the Republican primary.  Altschuler also had the endorsement of the Conservative Party and Independence Party.

On election day, Bishop prevailed by a 52.2%-47.8% margin.

Primary results

General election

Results

District 2

Republican incumbent Peter King, who was redistricted from the 3rd district, said in May 2011 that the Nassau County Republican Party had encouraged him to run for president. King also said, however, that he was focused "entirely on getting re-elected to Congress." King had the endorsement of the Conservative Party and Independence Party.

The Democrats nominated Vivianne Falcone to challenge King.  Falcone also had the endorsement of the Working Families Party.

King won re-election by a margin of more than 15%.

General election

Results

District 3 

Democratic incumbent Steve Israel ran for re-election. Israel, along with the endorsement of the Democratic Party, has the endorsement of the Working Families Party and the Independence Party.  The Republican Party and the Conservative Party endorsed Stephen LaBate.

General election

Results

District 4 

Democratic incumbent Carolyn McCarthy, who had represented the 4th district since 1997, ran for another term.  On June 26, 2012, Nassau County Legislator Fran Becker, defeated Frank Scaturro in a primary election for the Republican nomination, while Scaturro defeated Becker in the Conservative Party primary as a write-in candidate.  The Independence Party and Working Families Party endorsed McCarthy.

Primary results

General election

Results

District 5 

Incumbent Democrat Gregory Meeks defeated former New York City Councilman Alan Jennings, rapper Michael Scala, and Joseph Marthone in the Democratic primary.  The Republican Party endorsed Alan Jennings.

Primary results

General election

Results

District 6

The 6th district was an open seat, consisting mostly of territory from the former 5th and 9th districts. Neither of the two incumbents in those districts, Democrat Gary Ackerman from the 5th and Republican Bob Turner from the 9th, sought re-election. Ackerman, who represented most of the territory in the newly-drawn 6th, retired, while Turner dropped out of the race in March 2012 to run against incumbent Democrat Kirsten Gillibrand in the United States Senate election in New York, 2012.

On June 26, 2012, New York State Assemblywoman Grace Meng defeated fellow assemblyman Rory Lancman and New York City Councilwoman Elizabeth Crowley in a Democratic primary election. Councilman Dan Halloran is running as the Republican nominee. Working Families Party endorsed Lancman. Green Party endorsed Evergreen Chou.

Primary results

General election

Results

District 7

Incumbent Nydia Velazquez, who was redistricted from the 12th district, defeated City Councilman Erik Dilan, Dan O'Connor, and George Martinez in a Democratic Party primary election.

Primary results

General election

Results

District 8

Incumbent Democrat Edolphus Towns, who was redistricted from the 10th district and was first elected in 1982, announced in April 2012 that he would abandon his plans for re-election.

New York State Assembly member Hakeem Jeffries defeated New York City Council member Charles Barron in the Democratic primary on June 26, 2012. Towns's son, Darryl, a former member of the New York State Assembly, was formerly considered the "next in line" for the seat; however, in 2011 he accepted a position in the administration of Governor Andrew Cuomo, thereby lessening the chance he would run.

Colin Beavan, the subject of the book and film No Impact Man, was the Green Party candidate.

Primary results

General election

Results

District 9
Democrat Yvette Clarke, who was redistricted from the 11th district and has represented that district since 2007, sought re-election in her new district. Sylvia Kinard, an attorney and the ex-wife of Bill Thompson (a current/former Democratic nominee for Mayor of New York City), challenged Clarke.

Primary results

General election

Results

District 10 

Long-time incumbent Democrat Jerrold Nadler, who sought re-election,  faced a challenge from Republican Michael Chan, an economics professor at New York University.

General election

Results

District 11

Incumbent Republican Michael Grimm, who was redistricted from the 13th district and was first elected in 2010, sought re-election.

Mark Murphy, a former aide to New York City Public Advocate Bill de Blasio was the Democratic nominee. Restaurateur Alex Borgognone initially sought the Democratic nomination to challenge Grimm, but abandoned those plans in December 2011. Henry "Hank" Bardel was the Green Party candidate.

Grimm won re-election by a margin of 52.8% to 46.2%.

General election

Results

District 12 

Reshma Saujani, who unsuccessfully challenged incumbent Carolyn Maloney, who was redistricted from the 14th district, in the 2010 Democratic primary, decided to retire rather than run again.

General election

Results

District 13

Incumbent Democrat Charles B. Rangel, who was redistricted from the 15th district and was censured by the House of Representatives after being found guilty of ethics violations, filed to run for re-election in February 2011. Vincent Morgan, a former member of Rangel's staff who unsuccessfully challenged Rangel in the 2010, will run again. State senator Adriano Espaillat; Joyce Johnson; former state assemblyman Adam Clayton Powell IV, who has unsuccessfully challenged Rangel twice in the past; assemblyman Robert J. Rodriguez; Clyde Williams, a former adviser to Bill Clinton and a former political director of the Democratic National Committee; and assemblyman Keith Wright may also seek the Democratic nomination.

On the night of the June 26 primary, it seemed as though the incumbent Rangel had defeated his closest challenger, State Senator Espaillat, by a 45%-40% margin; Rangel celebrated victory and Espaillat conceded defeat. However,  as the counting continued, that margin narrowed considerably.  A number of precincts were very late in reporting and Espaillat went to  court claiming irregularities in that his supporters had been improperly turned away from polling locations.  On Saturday July 7, 2012, Rangel received the primary victory by a margin of 990 votes. The New York City Board of Elections released that Rangel received 18,940 votes and Espaillat had 17,950.  On July 9, 2012, Espaillat conceded the election to Rangel.

Primary results

General election

Results

District 14 

Current New York State Senator Rubén Díaz Sr., a Democrat, has expressed interest in running for a Congressional seat, depending on the outcome of redistricting. Díaz, prior to redistricting, resides in the 7th district, represented by incumbent Democrat Joe Crowley, who has been redistricted to the 14th district.

The new district runs from Newtown Creek in Sunnyside and over LaGuardia Airport and over the three Long Island Sound bridges to the Pelham, Westchester, border.

General election

Results

District 15 

José E. Serrano, incumbent Representative for the 16th district, ran for and won an 11th term.

General election

Results

District 16

Eliot Engel, incumbent Representative for the 17th district, ran for and won a 12th term.

Primary results

General election

Results

District 17

Incumbent Democrat Nita Lowey, who was redistricted from the 18th district, ran for re-election.

Joe Carvin, the town supervisor of Rye, was the Republican nominee, after having withdrawn from his abortive effort to run in the U.S. senate election.

Frank Morganthaler, former Lieutenant of NYFD and private investigator, challenged Nita Lowey and running on an independent line, We the People. 

Army reservist Mark Rosen, who sought the seat in 2010 but was forced to drop out of the race after being deployed to Afghanistan, was expected to seek the Republican nomination. Rosen retired from the Army, eliminating the threat of redeployment during election cycle, but was redistricted out of the district and unable to run against Lowey a second time.

Primary results

General election

Results

District 18

Republican Nan Hayworth, who was redistricted from the 19th district and has represented that district since January 2011, ran for re-election. State senator Greg Ball, who had considered challenging Hayworth in the Republican primary, instead sought re-election. Democrat John Hall, who represented the 19th district from 2007 until 2011, announced in July 2011 that he would not run again.

Sean Patrick Maloney, a lawyer and former Clinton staffer, won the Democratic primary with 48% of the vote on June 26, 2012. Other candidates included: Matthew Alexander, the mayor of Wappingers Falls; Richard Becker, a cardiologist; Duane Jackson, a street vendor; and Tom Wilson, the mayor of Tuxedo Park.

On election day, Maloney won by a narrow margin.  Maloney became New York's first openly gay Member of Congress.

Primary results

General election

Polling

Results

District 19

Republican Chris Gibson, who was redistricted from the 20th district, has represented that district since 2011. With redistricting settled, the new 19th district went from being a Republican-leaning district to being a swing district.  
Because of the dissolution of Maurice Hinchey's district, much of that district, including all of Ulster and Sullivan counties, was dissolved into this new district. Ulster County Executive Mike Hein declined to seek the Democratic nomination. Former federal prosecutor and Ulster County Democratic Party chairman, Julian Schreibman, sought the Democratic nomination. Joel Tyner, a member of the Dutchess County legislature, also sought the Democratic nomination to challenge Gibson.  Schreibman prevailed in the Democratic primary.

Primary results

General election

Results

District 20 

Incumbent Democrat Paul Tonko will seek re-election in this mostly unchanged district that was formerly numbered 21. Bob Dieterich will run as the Republican nominee.

The district's territory is heavily Democratic and Tonko won re-election without significant competition.

General election

Results

District 21

Republican businessman Matt Doheny, who unsuccessfully challenged Democratic incumbent Bill Owens (who was redistricted from the 23rd district) in 2010, chose to run again. Doheny secured the Independence Party line and the Conservative Party lines, the latter of which he did not have in 2010. Kelly Eustis, the 23-year-old executive director of One Nation PAC, eventually deciding against running. Jeff Stabins, an eccentric politician who until recently lived in Hernando County, Florida, expressed interest in the GOP nomination, having relocated to Sacketts Harbor, New York to seek the seat. Corrections officer Tim Stampfler announced his self-described long-shot candidacy in December 2011. Kellie Greene, an Oswego County native and theologian who most recently lived in Arizona, announced her intention to return to New York to primary Doheny in January 2012. Colton resident and anti-cancer activist Donald Hassig sought and received the Green Party nomination; Hassig appeared on the Green line despite the party's disavowal of him over his stance on immigration.  Doheny defeated Greene in the Republican primary, and appeared on the Republican, Conservative, and Independence Party lines in the fall election. Hassig dropped out of the race November 3, endorsing Owens, but remained on the ballot.

Primary results

General election

Results

District 22

Republican Richard Hanna, who was redistricted from the 24th district, had represented that district since 2011.  Dan Lamb, district representative for outgoing 22nd District Representative Maurice Hinchey, also sought the seat, with Hinchey's endorsement.  Hanna defeated Michael Kicinski, who was backed by Carl Paladino, Doug Hoffman and other Tea Party activists, in the Republican primary.

Primary results

General election

Results

District 23

Incumbent Republican Tom Reed, who was redistricted from the 29th district, was elected to his seat in November 2010. Reed was initially noncommittal regarding re-election, stating in July 2011 that "Re-election is the farthest thing from my mind;" he officially announced for re-election on April 30, 2012. 
Under the proposed redistricting plan set forth by the special master, Tompkins County (currently in district 22) would be redistricted into Reed's district, which would pit candidates for that area up against Reed.  Matthew Zeller, an Afghanistan war veteran and former CIA officer who unsuccessfully challenged Reed in 2010, has endorsed Tompkins County legislator Nate Shinagawa for the 23rd district seat.  Nate Shinagawa won the Democratic Primary election over Leslie Danks Burke (also an Ithaca resident) and Melissa Dobson on June 26, 2012.

Primary results

General election

Results

District 24

Republican Ann Marie Buerkle, who has represented the 25th district since 2011, sought re-election in the 24th district. Dan Maffei, who represented the 25th district from 2009 until 2011, and Brianne Murphy, an attorney, sought the Democratic nomination to challenge Buerkle. Tom Buckel, a member of the Onondaga County legislature, had considered seeking the Democratic nomination; however Buckel decided instead to run for the New York Supreme Court. On February 6, Robert Paul Spencer announced he would run in the Republican Primary against Buerkle, citing his opposition to Buerkle's vote in favor of the National Defense Authorization Act, which Spencer believed to be unconstitutional. Buerkle and Maffei won their respective party nominations and were joined on the general election ballot by Ursula Rozum, a 28-year-old public-transportation advocate serving as the Green Party nominee.

General election

Results

District 25

Incumbent Democrat Louise Slaughter, who was redistricted from the 28th district and has represented the Rochester metropolitan area since 1987, ran for re-election. Monroe County Executive Maggie Brooks sought the Republican nomination. Andrew Decker, the sixth great-nephew of Betsy Ross, sought the Republican nomination. Gates Supervisor Mark Assini and former Buffalo Bills defensive tackle Fred Smerlas, who previously passed on a 2010 run, also mentioned possible runs.

General election

Results

District 26

Incumbent Democrat Brian Higgins, who was redistricted from the 27th district, sought re-election.  Although his district was expected to become more friendly to Democrats in redistricting, the defeat of Higgins' protege, Chris Fahey, to Republican-backed Democrat Michael P. Kearns in a New York State Assembly race led to the perception that Higgins may have been more vulnerable than previously believed.  Previous names linked to runs on the Republican line included 2010 gubernatorial nominee Carl Paladino and former Bills running back Thurman Thomas, both of whom declined to seek the seat.  Michael H. Madigan, a Grand Island businessman, served as the Republican nominee for the seat.

General election

Results

District 27

Incumbent Democrat Kathy Hochul, who was redistricted from the 26th district seat that she won in a June 2011 special election, sought election to her first full term. Former Erie County Executive Chris Collins and David Bellavia, whose petition to run in the 2011 election was rejected, faced each other in the Republican primary; Collins prevailed.

Barry Weinstein, the town supervisor of Amherst; former New York Attorney General Dennis Vacco; Assembly Minority Leader Brian Kolb (who has historically rejected calls to seek higher office), and state senator and former Erie County sheriff Patrick Gallivan were all linked to potential runs for the seat, although all of them either declined or never followed through.

Primary results

General election

Results

See also
 New York state elections, 2012
 United States Senate election in New York, 2012

References

External links
New York State Board of Elections
United States House of Representatives elections in New York, 2012 at Ballotpedia
New York U.S. House at OurCampaigns.com
Campaign contributions for U.S. Congressional races in New York at OpenSecrets
Outside spending at the Sunlight Foundation

United States House of Representatives
New York
2012